Dry Cleaning are an English post-punk band who formed in South London in 2017. The band is composed of vocalist Florence Shaw, guitarist Tom Dowse, bassist Lewis Maynard and drummer Nick Buxton. They are noted for their use of spoken word primarily in lieu of sung vocals, as well as their unconventional lyrics. Their musical style has been compared to Wire, Magazine and Joy Division. They have been described as "Annette Peacock fronting the Fall or PiL or Siouxsie and the Banshees".

The band's debut album, New Long Leg, was released in April 2021 to widespread critical acclaim, with its follow-up, Stumpwork, released in October 2022 to further accolades.

History

Formation
When Lewis Maynard, Tom Dowse and Nick Buxton – old friends whose previous bands had crossed paths in London united to start a new band together in 2017, they did so with the intention of doing so for fun. Rehearsing from the garage at Maynard's mothers house, the trio spent the next few months writing the songs that would ultimately become Dry Cleaning.

Vocalist Florence Shaw had met Tom Dowse around 2010 at the Royal College of Art where they both were students, and quickly became friends.

Convincing Shaw to join the band took months. The rest of the band members invited her to one of their rehearsals. Drummer Nick Buxton told Shaw she could just talk instead of sing and gave her a playlist that included Grace Jones' "Private Life" and other similar tracks. She finally accepted and went into rehearsal with "writing from my old drawings, stuff I’d written on my phone, diaries, things I’d seen in adverts and thought were funny" — and read aloud as the other three played their instruments around her. She recalls this moment “like when you see those cheesy films about bands, and they’re writing the hit, and there’s a magic moment.”

"Magic of Meghan", EPs and New Long Leg
The band released their debut single, "Magic of Meghan" in 2019. Shaw wrote the song after going through a break-up and moving out of her former partner's apartment the same day that Meghan Markle and Prince Harry announced they were engaged. This was followed by the release of two EPs that year: Sweet Princess in August and Boundary Road Snacks and Drinks in October. The band were included as part of the NME 100 of 2020, as well as DIY magazine's Class of 2020.

The band signed to 4AD in late 2020 and shared a new single, "Scratchcard Lanyard". In February 2021, the band shared details of their debut studio album, New Long Leg. They also shared the single "Strong Feelings". The album, which was produced by John Parish, was released on 2 April 2021.

Stumpwork
In June 2022, the band announced a new single, "Don't Press Me", which premiered on BBC Radio 6 Music on 14 June. That same day they announced their second album Stumpwork, which was released on 21 October 2022. As with their debut, the album was recorded at Rockfield Studios in Wales, and produced by John Parish.

Members
 Florence Shaw – vocals, percussion, tape loops
 Lewis Maynard – bass
 Tom Dowse – guitar
 Nick Buxton – drums, percussion, programming, keyboards, saxophone

Discography

Studio albums

Compilation albums

Extended plays

Singles

Awards and nominations

References

2019 establishments in England
Musical groups from London
Musical groups established in 2019
Post-punk revival music groups
4AD artists